Express is a Spanish thriller television series created by Iván Escobar and directed by Gabe Ibáñez and Iñaki Peñafiel. Starring Maggie Civantos as lead character, the plot concerns the so-called express kidnappings. It is the first Starzplay original series produced in Spain. It was released on 16 January 2022.

Premise 
Consisting of a dramatization of the so-called express kidnappings, the fiction (also featuring "comedy elements") tracks the story of Bárbara (a criminological psychologist who suffers one of such short-lived abductions) and her family.

Cast

Production 
Created by Iván Escobar and written by Escobar together with Antonio Sánchez Olivas and Martín Suárez, the series was produced by The Mediapro Studio, Starzplay (distributor in Spain and Latin-America) and Pantaya (distributor in the United States and Puerto Rico). Elsewhere, the Mediapro Studio Distribution will serve as distributor. It is thus the first Starzplay original series produced in Spain. Filming began by mid March 2021 and wrapped by early June 2021. Directed by Gabe Ibáñez and Iñaki Peñafiel, Express was primarily shot in a film set in Madrid. Shooting locations also included the Casa Huarte in the Puerta de Hierro area of Madrid. Consisting of 8 episodes, it is set for a 16 January 2022 release.

References

External links
 

2022 Spanish television series debuts
2020s Spanish drama television series
Spanish-language television shows
Television shows filmed in Spain
Crime thriller television series
Kidnapping in television
Spanish crime television series
Spanish thriller television series